Erica Adams (born July 16, 1969) is an American former professional tennis player.

Biography
Born in 1969, she is the daughter of basketball player Bunk Adams, who was a Pan American Games gold medalist with the national team. She played college tennis for Purdue University from 1988 and 1991, earning All-Big Ten honors on four occasions.

Adams joined the professional tour in 1992 and went on to reach a best singles ranking of 215 in the world, appearing in the qualifying draws for both Wimbledon and the US Open. She played in the main draw of the Quebec WTA Tour tournament in 1994 and won two ITF titles. As a doubles player she won a further four ITF tournaments.

ITF finals

Singles: 3 (2–1)

Doubles: 7 (4–3)

References

External links
 
 

1969 births
Living people
American female tennis players
Purdue Boilermakers women's tennis players
Tennis people from Ohio
20th-century American women